The 1928 Indiana Hoosiers football team represented the Indiana Hoosiers in the 1928 college football season as members of the Big Ten Conference. The Hoosiers played their home games at Memorial Stadium in Bloomington, Indiana. The team was coached by Harlan Page, in his third year as head coach.

Schedule

References

Indiana
Indiana Hoosiers football seasons
Indiana Hoosiers football